The discography of Rachel Stevens, an English pop singer, consists of two studio albums and eight singles. Stevens released her solo debut studio album Funky Dory that September. The album reached number nine on the UK Albums Chart and the British Phonographic Industry (BPI) awarded it with a gold certification in October 2003. Two singles, "Sweet Dreams My LA Ex" and "Funky Dory", were initially released from the album: "Sweet Dreams My LA Ex" peaked at number two in the UK and received a silver certification from the BPI. In July 2004, Stevens released the single "Some Girls" as a charity record for Sport Relief, and the single's success prompted Polydor to re-issue Funky Dory with three new songs.

Come and Get It, her second studio album, was released in October 2005.  The album peaked at #28 on  the Albums Chart, even though two of its three singles managed to reach the Top 10.

Albums

Studio albums

Compilations

Singles

As lead artist

As featured artist

Promotional singles

Other appearances

Music videos

References

External links

 
 

Discographies of British artists
Pop music discographies